A rotating gas-check (more commonly known as an automatic gas-check) was a copper plate that automatically attached itself to a specially-designed studless projectile of rifled muzzle-loading ("RML") artillery, sealing the escape of gas between the projectile and the barrel and imparting axial rotation to the projectile.

Gallery

 RML 12.5in Studless Palliser Shell Mk I with Automatic Gas-Check
 RML 12.5in Studless Common Shell Mk I with Automatic Gas-Check

See also
 Gas-checks in British RML heavy guns
 Attached gas-check

Notes

External links
1. Photos of a used 9 inch automatic gas-check recovered from the sea. http://fortlytton.net.au/?page_id=294

2. Photos of four gas-checks. http://www.victorianforts.co.uk/art/check.htm

3. Photo of 17.72 inch automatic gas-check http://www.bbc.co.uk/ahistoryoftheworld/objects/_GozUMNFTpem-NJXZpFgAQ

References
 1881 
 1887A 

Coastal artillery
Artillery of the United Kingdom
Victorian-era weapons of the United Kingdom
Naval guns of the United Kingdom
Artillery ammunition